The Eternal Feminine may refer to:

 The Eternal Feminine (1931 film), British film
 The Eternal Feminine (2017 film), Mexican film